John Hardie Moulder (29 September 1881 – 13 October 1933) was an English cricketer who played first-class cricket for Surrey, London County and Transvaal between 1902 and 1913. He also played Southern League football for Brentford.

References

External links

1881 births
1933 deaths
Surrey cricketers
London County cricketers
English cricketers
Gauteng cricketers
Cricketers from Greater London
Southern Football League players
Brentford F.C. players
English footballers
English expatriates in South Africa
People from Richmond, London
Footballers from the London Borough of Richmond upon Thames
Association football forwards